Georgios Lassanis (1793–1870) was a scholar and politician from Kozani, Greece. 

He studied literature and philosophy in Leipzig, then, in 1818, moved to Odessa, where he taught at the Greek community's business school. In Russia he became a member of Filiki Eteria, a secret Greek organisation. In 1820, he abandoned teaching and Odessa, and became the adjutant of Alexander Ypsilantis. Lassanis and Ypsilantis were arrested by Austrian authorities and they were kept in close confinement for seven years in Terezín. In 1827 they were released at the insistence of emperor Nicholas I of Russia. After the death of Ypsilantis, Lassanis returned to Greece. In Greece he took part in the Greek revolution with Dimitrios Ypsilantis. After the establishment of the first Greek state he became general inspector of the army of eastern Greece, and in 1837 he became finance minister. 

He died at the age of 77, in 1870.

Georgios Lassanis' mansion is preserved in a square of Kozani, which bears his name (Plateia Lassani), and it is used as the Municipal Map Library. In his honor, the municipality of Kozani holds a Lassaneia festival every August, with theatre, concerts, athletic events, etc.

See also
List of Macedonians (Greek)

References
kozanh.gr

1793 births
1870 deaths
People from Kozani
Greek Macedonians
Members of the Filiki Eteria
Greek people of the Greek War of Independence
Macedonia under the Ottoman Empire
Prisoners and detainees of Austria
Finance ministers of Greece
Members of Sacred Band (1821)